Ernie Danjean (March 5, 1934 – June 19, 1995) was a linebacker in the National Football League and all-star in the Canadian Football League.

After playing college football Auburn University, Danjean was drafted by the Green Bay Packers in the nineteenth round of the 1957 NFL Draft and played that season with the team.

He moved to the Canadian Football League in 1959, playing for the Hamilton Tiger-Cats and being selected an All-Star on the strength of his 3 interceptions. He was traded to the Calgary Stampeders during the 1960 season when he played in only 3 games. But from 1961 to 1963, he played in 41 of 45 regular season games. In 1962, he had another interception and recovered 4 fumbles for a 9-6 team which lost the Western conference final.

See also
List of Green Bay Packers players

References

1934 births
1995 deaths
American football linebackers
Auburn Tigers football players
Calgary Stampeders players
Green Bay Packers players
Hamilton Tiger-Cats players
Players of Canadian football from New Orleans
Players of American football from New Orleans